"Gardening at Night" is a song by American rock band R.E.M. It was recorded for the band's 1982 debut EP Chronic Town.

Writing
The song is said to have been written on a mattress in the front yard of the Oconee Street church in Athens, Georgia. At that point in the band's career, Peter Buck has stated that their musical modus operandi was "three chords and a six-pack of beer."

In the booklet of the 2006 And I Feel Fine... The Best of the I.R.S Years 1982–1987, Bill Berry wrote the following of "Gardening at Night":

The song's title served as the inspiration for the name of the band's publishing company Night Garden Music.

Versions
Four different studio recordings of the song have been officially released. The original Chronic Town version can be found on the CD edition of Dead Letter Office, on the 2006 R.E.M. compilation And I Feel Fine: The Best of the I.R.S. Years 1982-1987 and more recently in the band's 2011 career-spanning greatest hits compilation Part Lies, Part Heart, Part Truth, Part Garbage 1982–2011. A version featuring an earlier vocal take appears on the 1988 compilation Eponymous. An acoustic version of the song appears as a bonus track on the European "I.R.S. Vintage Years" reissue of Dead Letter Office. A substantially slower electric version of the song appears on the bonus disc accompanying the special collector's edition of And I Feel Fine.

Six live versions have been officially released–the first, recorded on July 13, 1983, appeared on the Dutch "I.R.S. Years" reissue of the band's debut album Murmur. The second appeared as a B-side of the 12-inch "(Don't Go Back To) Rockville" single in 1984. The third appeared on a promotional CD called The Alternative Radio Sampler. A performance at Larry's Hideaway, Toronto, Ontario, from July 9, 1983, was released on the 2008 Deluxe Edition reissue of Murmur. A performance from Chicago's Aragon Ballroom from July 7, 1984 was released on the 2009 Deluxe Edition reissue of Reckoning. Finally, a performance from the band's 2007 rehearsal tour in Ireland was released on the Live At The Olympia In Dublin album.

R.E.M. performed the song at their 2007 induction into the Rock and Roll Hall of Fame. Singer Michael Stipe dedicated the song to his father. Stipe also mentioned that the band considered this their first "real" composition after 20 or 30 presumably failed efforts.

See also
Lotion (EP) – "Gardening Your Wig" interpolates this song and Hüsker Dü's "Flip Your Wig"

References

1982 songs
R.E.M. songs
Songs written by Bill Berry
Songs written by Peter Buck
Songs written by Mike Mills
Songs written by Michael Stipe
Songs based on actual events
Song recordings produced by Mitch Easter
Song recordings produced by Michael Stipe
Song recordings produced by Mike Mills
Song recordings produced by Bill Berry
Song recordings produced by Peter Buck